A custody officer is an attested constable, usually of the rank of sergeant, in the United Kingdom and in the United States who works in a custody suite. A custody officer is in charge of the protection and transportation of detainees and/ or prisoners between a jail or prison and court. Most custody officers in the United States are also limited commissioned law enforcement officers and can only enforce the laws that directly pertain to  custody enforcement.

England and Wales

In England and Wales, the custody officer must make a decision to authorise or refuse the detention of any detainee presented before him.  This also applies to detainees presented before them by other public servants with power of arrest who may use the suite from time to time, for example revenue and customs officers and immigration officers. The officer presents the arrested person to the custody officer and explains the circumstances of the arrest, with further detention of the person being authorised if the custody officer deems it necessary to do so. It is not the custody officer's duty to determine whether the arrest was lawful or not, code G of PACE states that this duty rests on the arresting officer.

The custody officer must ensure that during the whole time the person is detained at the custody suite, police officers and police staff who deal with the detained person adhere to the PACE Codes of Practice regarding the rights and treatment of persons arrested.

These Codes of Practice include various requirements regarding time limits and record keeping for certain procedures that may take place whilst the person is in custody and the custody officer is responsible for ensuring these too.

Scotland 

The custody sergeant (custody supervisor) is the authorising sergeant for the detention of the accused. Under section 7 of the Criminal Justice (Scotland) Act 2016, this is done by the authoriser doing what is called a "section 14 test". If both parts of this test are satisfactory, the detention will proceed. A person who has been detained or arrested is taken to a police station and the person is booked into custody, often by a member of the police service of Scotland, usually a police constable or higher; however, it can also be done by other agencies such as GEOAmey, Home Office, Immigration Enforcement and border agency. As the Police and Criminal Evidence Act 1984 does not apply in Scotland, the care of people in custody is governed by different (but very similar) guidance under the Criminal Justice (Scotland) Act 2016

Notes

Police positions in the United Kingdom